Eugoa trifascia is a lichen moth in the family Erebidae, subfamily Arctiinae. The species was first described by Francis Walker in 1862. It is found on Peninsular Malaysia and Borneo. The habitat consists of lowland to lower montane forests.

References

Nudariina
Moths of Borneo
Moths described in 1862